Tu ten kámen (full name:Tu ten kámen aneb Kterak láskou možno v mziku vzplanout třeba k nebožtíku) is a 1923 Czechoslovak comedy film directed by Karl Anton. The movie is considered lost.

Cast
Vlasta Burian as Fridolín
Ferenc Futurista as Egyptologist Rapapides Bulva
Josef Rovenský as Mayor of Zelená Lhota
Josef Šváb-Malostranský as Cheesemonger
Eman Fiala as  Ne'er-do-well / Fake Egyptologist
Karel Lamač as  Drtichlup
Anny Ondra as Aenny (as Anny Ondráková)
Martin Frič as Quartet Singer
Rolf Passer as Miloš
Karel Schleichert as Town Councillor
Frantisek Beranský as Quartet Singer
Jan W. Speerger

References

External links
 

1923 films
1923 comedy films
Czechoslovak black-and-white films
Czech silent films
Czechoslovak comedy films
1923 lost films
Lost comedy films